Hooker Township is one of twenty-four townships in Gage County, Nebraska, United States. The population was 163 at the 2020 census. A 2021 estimate placed the township's population at 163.

References

External links
City-Data.com

Townships in Gage County, Nebraska
Townships in Nebraska